George Frederick Warren Jr. (February 16, 1874 – May 24, 1938) was an agricultural economist who became an advisor to President Franklin D. Roosevelt. He was (according to Liaquat Ahamed) central to Roosevelt's momentous decision to take the United States off the gold standard.

Warren published extensively; the published works included in this stub are only a part of what is in WorldCat.

His papers are archived at the Mann Library at Cornell University. A short biography appears at nebraskaauthors.org. His picture appeared on the cover of Time on November 27, 1933.

Published works

Citations

References 

20th-century American economists
Agricultural economists
Economists from Nebraska
United States presidential advisors
Gold standard